Eli Small (born 1767 at Petersfield, Hampshire; died 20 May 1837 at Petersfield]) was an English professional cricketer who made 2 known appearances in first-class cricket matches from 1788 to 1796.  He was a son of John Small and brother of Jack Small.

Career
He was mainly associated with Hampshire.

References

External sources
 CricketArchive record

1767 births
1837 deaths
English cricketers
English cricketers of 1787 to 1825
Hampshire cricketers
Hambledon cricketers